Nikos Kazantzakis (2 March (OS 18 February) 188326 October 1957) was a Greek writer. Widely considered a giant of modern Greek literature, he was nominated for the Nobel Prize in Literature in nine different years.

Kazantzakis's novels included Zorba the Greek (published in 1946 as Life and Times of Alexis Zorbas), Christ Recrucified (1948), Captain Michalis (1950, translated Freedom or Death), and The Last Temptation of Christ (1955). He also wrote plays, travel books, memoirs, and philosophical essays, such as The Saviors of God: Spiritual Exercises. His fame spread in the English-speaking world due to cinematic adaptations of Zorba the Greek (1964) and The Last Temptation of Christ (1988).

He also translated a number of notable works into Modern Greek, such as the Divine Comedy, Thus Spoke Zarathustra, On the Origin of Species, and Homer's Iliad and Odyssey.

Biography

When Kazantzakis was born in 1883 in Kandiye, now Heraklion with ancestry from the village of Myrtia, Heraklion. Crete had not yet joined the modern Greek state (which had been established in 1832), and was still under the rule of the Ottoman Empire. Then he went to the Sorbonne in 1907 to study philosophy. There he fell under the influence of Henri Bergson. His 1909 doctoral dissertation at the Sorbonne was a reworked version of his 1906 dissertation under the title Friedrich Nietzsche dans la philosophie du droit et de la cité ("Friedrich Nietzsche on the Philosophy of Right and the State"). Upon his return to Greece, he began translating works of philosophy. In 1914 he met Angelos Sikelianos. Together they travelled for two years in places where Greek Orthodox Christian culture flourished, largely influenced by the enthusiastic nationalism of Sikelianos.

Kazantzakis married Galatea Alexiou in 1911; they divorced in 1926. Kazantzakis met Eleni Samiou (Helen) in 1924. They began a romantic relationship in 1928, though they were not married until 1945. Samiou helped Kazantzakis with his work, typing drafts, accompanying him on his travels, and managing his business affairs. They were married until his death in 1957. Samiou died in 2004.

Between 1922 and his death in 1957, he sojourned in Paris and Berlin (from 1922 to 1924), Italy, Russia (in 1925), Spain (in 1932), and then later in Cyprus, Aegina, Egypt, Mount Sinai, Czechoslovakia, Nice (he later bought a villa in nearby Antibes, in the Old Town section near the famed seawall), China, and Japan.

While in Berlin, where the political situation was explosive, Kazantzakis discovered communism and became an admirer of Vladimir Lenin. He never became a committed communist, but visited the Soviet Union and stayed with the Left Opposition politician and writer Victor Serge. He witnessed the rise of Joseph Stalin, and became disillusioned with Soviet-style communism. Around this time, his earlier nationalist beliefs were gradually replaced by a more universalist ideology. As a journalist in 1926 he got interviews from Miguel Primo de Rivera and the Italian dictator Benito Mussolini.

During WWII he was in Athens and translated the Iliad, together with the philologist Ioannis Kakridis. In 1945, he became the leader of a small party on the non-communist left, and entered the Greek government as Minister without Portfolio. He resigned this post the following year. In 1946, Kazantzakis became the head of the UNESCO Bureau of translations, the organization which promoted translations of literary work. However, he resigned in 1947 to concentrate on writing, and indeed produced most of hist literary output during the last ten years of his life. 

In 1946 The Society of Greek Writers recommended that Kazantzakis and Angelos Sikelianos be awarded the Nobel Prize for Literature. In 1957, he lost the Prize to Albert Camus by a single vote. Camus later said that Kazantzakis deserved the honour "a hundred times more" than himself. In total Kazantzakis was nominated in nine different years.

Death

Late in 1957, even though suffering from leukemia, he set out on one last trip to China and Japan. Falling ill on his return flight, he was transferred to Freiburg, Germany, where he died. He is buried at the highest point of the Walls of Heraklion, the Martinengo Bastion, looking out over the mountains and sea of Crete. His epitaph reads "I hope for nothing. I fear nothing. I am free." Kazantzakis developed this famously pithy phrasing of the philosophical ideal of cynicism, which dates back to at least the second century CE.

The 50th anniversary of the death of Nikos Kazantzakis was selected as main motif for a high-value euro collectors' coin; the €10 Greek Nikos Kazantzakis commemorative coin, minted in 2007. His image is on the obverse of the coin, while the reverse carries the National Emblem of Greece with his signature.

Literary work
Kazantzakis's first published work was the 1906 narrative, Serpent and Lily (Όφις και Κρίνο), which he signed with the pen name Karma Nirvami. In 1907 Kazantzakis went to Paris for his graduate studies and was deeply influenced by the philosophy of Henri Bergson, primarily the idea that a true understanding of the world comes from the combination of intuition, personal experience, and rational thought. The theme of rationalism mixed with irrationality later became central to many of Kazantzakis's later stories, characters, and personal philosophies. Later, in 1909, he wrote a one-act play titled Comedy, which was filled with  existential themes, predating the post-World War II existentialist movement in Europe spearheaded by writers like Jean-Paul Sartre and Camus. After completing his studies in Paris, he wrote the tragedy, "The Master Builder", based on a popular Greek folkloric myth.

Through the next several decades, from the 1910s through the 1930s, Kazantzakis traveled around Greece, much of Europe, northern Africa, and to several countries in Asia. Countries he visited include: Germany, Italy, France, The Netherlands, Romania, Egypt, Russia, Japan, and China, among others. These journeys put Kazantzakis in contact with different philosophies, ideologies, lifestyles, and people, all of which influenced him and his writings. Kazantzakis would often write about his influences in letters to friends, citing Sigmund Freud, the philosophy of Nietzsche, Buddhist theology, and communist ideology and major influences. While he continued to travel later in life, the bulk of his travel writing came from this time period.

Kazantzakis began writing The Odyssey: A Modern Sequel in 1924, and completed it in 1938 after fourteen years of writing and revision. The poem follows the hero of Homer's Odyssey, Odysseus, as he undertakes a final journey after the end of the original poem. Following the structure of Homer's Odyssey, it is divided into 24 rhapsodies and consists of 33,333 lines. While Kazantzakis felt this poem held his cumulative wisdom and experience, and that it was his greatest literary experience, critics were split, "some praised it as an unprecedented epic, [while] many simply viewed it as a hybristic act," with many scholars still being split to this day. A common criticism of The Odyssey: A Modern Sequel was aimed at Kazantzakis's over-reliance on flowery and metaphorical verse, a criticism that is also aimed at his works of fiction.

Many of Kazantzakis's most famous novels were published between 1940 and 1961, including Zorba the Greek (1946), Christ Recrucified (1948), Captain Michalis (1953), The Last Temptation of Christ (1955), and Report to Greco (1961).

Scholar Peter Bien argues that each story explores different aspects of post-World War II Greek culture such as religion, nationalism, political beliefs, the Greek Civil War, gender roles, immigration, and general cultural practices and beliefs. These works also explore what Kazantzakis believed to be the unique physical and spiritual location of Greece, a nation that belongs to neither the East nor the West, an idea he put forth in many of his letters to friends. As the scholar Peter Bien argued, "Kazantzakis viewed Greece's special mission as the reconciliation of Eastern instinct with Western reason," echoing the Bergsonian themes that balance logic against emotion found in many of Kazantzakis's novels.

Two of these works of fiction, Zorba the Greek and The Last Temptation of Christ had major motion picture adaptations in 1964 and 1988 respectively.

Language and use of Demotic Greek 
During the time when Kazantzakis was writing his novels, poems, and plays, the majority of "serious" Greek artistic work was written in Katharevousa, a "pure" form of the Greek language that was created to bridge Ancient Greek with Modern, Demotic Greek, and to "purify" Demotic Greek. The use of Demotic, among writers, gradually started to gain the upper hand only in the turn of the 20th century, under the influence of the New Athenian School (or Palamian).

In his letters to friends and correspondents, Kazantzakis wrote that he chose to write in Demotic Greek to capture the spirit of the people, and to make his writing resonate with the common Greek citizen. Moreover, he wanted to prove that the common spoken language of Greek was able to produce artistic, literary works. Or, in his own words, "Why not show off all the possibilities of demotic Greek?" Furthermore, Kazantzakis felt that it was important to record the vernacular of the everyday person, including Greek peasants, and often tried to include expressions, metaphors, and idioms he would hear while traveling throughout Greece, and incorporate them into his writing for posterity. At the time of writing, some scholars and critics condemned his work because it was not written in Katharevousa, while others praised it precisely because it was written in Demotic Greek.

Several critics have argued that Kazantzakis's writing was too flowery, filled with obscure metaphors, and difficult to read, despite the fact that his works were written in Demotic Greek. Kazantzakis scholar Peter Bien argues that the metaphors and language Kazantzakis used were taken directly from the peasants he encountered when traveling Greece. Bien asserts that, since Kazantzakis was trying to preserve the language of the people, he used their local metaphors and phrases to give his narrative an air of authenticity and preserve these phrases so that they were not lost.

Socialism 
Throughout his life, Kazantzakis reiterated his belief that "only socialism as the goal and democracy as the means" could provide an equitable solution to the "frightfully urgent problems of the age in which we are living." He saw the need for socialist parties throughout the world to put aside their bickering and unite so that the program of "socialist democracy" could prevail not just in Greece, but throughout the civilized world. He described socialism as a social system which "does not permit the exploitation of one person by another" and that "must guarantee every freedom."

Kazantzakis was anathema to the right-wing in Greece both before and after World War II. The right waged war against his books and called him "immoral" and a "Bolshevik troublemaker" and accused him of being a "Russian agent". He was also distrusted by the Greek and Russian Communist parties as a "bourgeois" thinker. However, upon his death in 1957, he was honored by the Chinese Communist party as a "great writer" and "devotee of peace." Following the war, he was temporarily leader of a minor Greek leftist party, while in 1945 he was, among others, a founding member of the Greek-Soviet friendship union.

Religious beliefs and relationship with the Greek Orthodox Church 
While Kazantzakis was deeply spiritual, he often discussed his struggle with religious faith, specifically his Greek Orthodoxy. Baptized Greek Orthodox as a child, he was fascinated by the lives of saints from a young age. As a young man he took a month long trip to Mount Athos, a major spiritual center for Greek Orthodoxy. Most critics and scholars of Kazantzakis agree that the struggle to find truth in religion and spirituality was central to a great deal of his works, and that some novels, like The Last Temptation of Christ and Christ Recrucified focus completely on questioning Christian morals and values. As he traveled Europe, he was influenced by various philosophers, cultures, and religions, like Buddhism, causing him to question his Christian beliefs. While never claiming to be an atheist, his public questioning and critique of the most fundamental Christian values put him at odds with some in the Greek Orthodox Church, and many of his critics. Scholars theorize that Kazantzakis's difficult relationship with many members of the clergy, and the more religiously conservative literary critics, came from his questioning. In his book Broken Hallelujah: Nikos Kazantzakis and Christian Theology, author Darren Middleton theorizes that, "Where the majority of Christian writers focus on God's immutability, Jesus' deity, and our salvation through God's grace, Kazantzakis emphasized divine mutability, Jesus' humanity, and God's own redemption through our effort," highlighting Kazantzakis's uncommon interpretation of traditional Orthodox Christian beliefs. Many Orthodox Church clergy condemned Kazantzakis's work and a campaign was started to excommunicate him. His reply was: "You gave me a curse, Holy fathers, I give you a blessing: may your conscience be as clear as mine and may you be as moral and religious as I" (""). While the excommunication was rejected by the top leadership of the Orthodox Church, it became emblematic of the persistent disapprobation from many Christian authorities for his political and religious views.

Modern scholarship tends to dismiss the idea that Kazantzakis was being sacrilegious or blasphemous with the content of his novels and beliefs. These scholars argue that, if anything, Kazantzakis was acting in accordance to a long tradition of Christians who publicly struggled with their faith, and grew a stronger and more personal connection to God through their doubt. Moreover, scholars like Darren J. N. Middleton argue that Kazantzakis's interpretation of the Christian faith predated the more modern, personalized interpretation of Christianity that has become popular in the years after Kazantzakis's death.

Ecumenical Patriarch Athenagoras, leader of the Orthodox Church, declared in 1961 in Heraklion: “Kazantzakis is a great man and his works grace the Patriarchal library.”

Bibliography of English translations

Translations of The Odyssey: A Modern Sequel, in whole or in part
The Odyssey [Selections from], partial translation in prose by Kimon Friar, Wake 12 (1953), pp. 58–65.
The Odyssey, excerpt translated by Kimon Friar, Chicago Review 8, No. 2 (Spring/Summer 1954), pp. 12–18.
"The Return of Odysseus", partial translation by Kimon Friar, The Atlantic Monthly 195, No. 6 (June 1955), pp. 110–112.
The Odyssey: A Modern Sequel, a full verse-translation by Kimon Friar, New York: Simon & Schuster, 1958; London: Secker and Warburg, 1958.
"Death, the Ant", from The Odyssey: A Modern Sequel, Book XV, 829–63, translated by Kimon Friar, The Charioteer, No. 1 (Summer 1960), p. 39.

Travel books
Spain, translated by Amy Mims, New York: Simon & Schuster, 1963.
Japan, China, translated by George C. Pappageotes, New York: Simon & Schuster, 1963; published in the United Kingdom as Travels in China & Japan, Oxford: Bruno Cassirer, 1964; London: Faber and Faber, 1964.
England, translated by Amy Mims, New York: Simon & Schuster, 1965; Oxford, Bruno Cassirer, 1965.
Journey to Morea, translated by F. A. Reed, New York: Simon & Schuster, 1965; published in the United Kingdom as Travels in Greece, Journey to Morea, Oxford, Bruno Cassirer, 1966.
Journeying: Travels in Italy, Egypt, Sinai, Jerusalem and Cyprus, translated by Themi Vasils and Theodora Vasils, Boston and Toronto: Little, Brown and Company, 1975; San Francisco: Creative Arts Books Co., 1984.
Russia, translated by A. Maskaleris and M. Antonakis, Creative Arts Books Co, 1989.

Novels
Zorba the Greek, translated by Carl Wildman, London: John Lehmann, 1952; New York: Simon & Schuster, 1953; Oxford: Bruno Cassirer, 1959; London & Boston: Faber and Faber, 1961; New York: Ballantine Books, 1964; and Zorba the Greek: The Saint's Life of Alexis Zorba, newly translated by Peter Bien, New York: Simon & Schuster, 2014.
The Greek Passion, translated by Jonathan Griffin, New York, Simon & Schuster, 1954; New York, Ballantine Books, 1965; published in the United Kingdom as Christ Recrucified, Oxford: Bruno Cassirer, 1954; London: Faber and Faber, 1954.
Freedom or Death, translated by Jonathan Griffin, New York: Simon & Schuster, 1954; New York: Ballantine, 1965; published in the United Kingdom as Freedom or Death, Oxford: Bruno Cassirer, 1956; London: Faber and Faber, 1956.
The Last Temptation, translated by Peter A. Bien, New York, Simon & Schuster, 1960; New York, Bantam Books, 1961; Oxford: Bruno Cassirer, 1961; London: Faber and Faber, 1975.
Saint Francis, translated by Peter A. Bien, New York: Simon & Schuster, 1962; published in the United Kingdom as God's Pauper: Saint Francis of Assisi, Oxford: Bruno Cassirer, 1962, 1975; London: Faber and Faber, 1975.
The Rock Garden, translated from French (in which it was originally written) by Richard Howard, New York: Simon & Schuster, 1963.
The Fratricides, translated by Athena Gianakas Dallas, New York: Simon & Schuster, 1964; Oxford: Bruno Cassirer, 1964.
Toda Raba, translated from French (in which it was originally written) by Amy Mims, New York: Simon & Schuster, 1964.
Report to Greco — see under Memoirs, essays and letters
Alexander the Great. A Novel [for children], translated by Theodora Vasils, Athens (Ohio): Ohio University Press, 1982.
At the Palaces of Knossos. A Novel [for children], translated by Themi and Theodora Vasilis, edited by Theodora Vasilis, London: Owen, 1988.  Adapted from the draft typewritten manuscript.
Father Yanaros [from the novel The Fratricides], translated by Theodore Sampson, in Modern Greek Short Stories, Vol. 1, edited by Kyr. Delopoulos, Athens: Kathimerini Publications, 1980.
Serpent and Lily, translated by Theodora Vasils, Berkeley: University of California Press, 1980.

Untranslated Novel
1946: "The Ascent" (Ο Ανήφορος), first edition Dioptra, 2022 - ISBN 978-618-220-072-8

Short Story
"He Wants to Be Free – Kill Him!", translated by Athena G. Dallas, "Greek Heritage" 1, No. 1 (Winter 1963), pp. 78–82.

Plays
Julian the Apostate: First staged in Paris, 1948.
Three Plays: Melissa, Kouros, Christopher Columbus, translated by Athena Gianakas-Dallas, New York: Simon & Schuster, 1969.
Christopher Columbus, translated by Athena Gianakas-Dallas, Kentfield (CA): Allen Press, 1972.  Edition limited to 140 copies.
From Odysseus, A Drama, partial translation by M. Byron Raizis, "The Literary Review" 16, No. 3 (Spring 1973), p. 352.
Comedy: A Tragedy in One Act, translated by Kimon Friar, "The Literary Review" 18, No. 4 (Summer 1975), pp. 417–454 {61}.
Sodom and Gomorrah, A Play, translated by Kimon Friar, "The Literary Review" 19, No. 2 (Winter 1976), pp. 122–256 (62).
Two plays: Sodom and Gomorrah and Comedy: A Tragedy in One Act, translated by Kimon Friar, Minneapolis: North Central Publishing Co., 1982.
Buddha, translated by Kimon Friar and Athena Dallas-Damis, San Diego (CA): Avant Books, 1983.

Poems
1932 - 1937: "Tertsines" , first edition 1960 - ISBN 978-960-794-819-9 (untranslated)
Christ (poetry), translated by Kimon Friar, "Journal of Hellenic Diaspora" (JHD) 10, No. 4 (Winter 1983), pp. 47–51 (60).

Memoirs, essays and letters
The Saviours of God: Spiritual Exercises, translated by Kimon Friar, New York: Simon & Schuster, 1960.
Report to Greco, translated by Peter A. Bien, New York: Simon & Schuster, 1965; Oxford: Bruno Cassirer, 1965; London: Faber and Faber, 1965; New York: Bantam Books, 1971.
Symposium, translated by Theodora Vasils e Themi Vasils, New York: Thomas Y. Crowell Company, 1974; New York: Minerva Press, 1974.
Friedrich Nietzsche on the Philosophy of Right and the State, translated by O. Makridis, New York: State University of NY Press, 2007.
From The Saviours of God: Spiritual Exercises, translated by Kimon Friar, "The Charioteer", No. 1 (Summer 1960), pp. 40–51; reprinted in "The Charioteer" 22 and 23 (1980/1981), pp. 116–129 {57}.
The Suffering God: Selected Letters to Galatea and to Papastephanou, translated by Philip Ramp and Katerina Anghelaki Rooke, New Rochelle (NY): Caratzas Brothers, 1979.
The Angels of Cyprus, translated by Amy Mims, in Cyprus '74: Aphrodite's Other Face, edited by Emmanuel C. Casdaglis, Athens: National Bank of Greece, 1976.
Burn Me to Ashes: An Excerpt, translated by Kimon Friar, "Greek Heritage" 1, No. 2 (Spring 1964), pp. 61–64.
Drama and Contemporary Man, An Essay, translated by Peter Bien, "The Literary Review" 19, No. 2 (Winter 1976), pp. 15–121 {62}.
The Homeric G.B.S., "The Shaw Review" 18, No. 3 (Sept. 1975), pp. 91–92. Greek original written for a 1946 Greek language radio broadcast by BBC Overseas Service, on the occasion of George Bernard Shaw's 90th birthday.
Hymn (Allegorical), translated by M. Byron Raizis, "Spirit" 37, No. 3 (Fall 1970), pp. 16–17.
Two Dreams, translated by Peter Mackridge, "Omphalos" 1, No. 2 (Summer 1972), p. 3.
 Nikos Kazantzakis Pages at the Historical Museum of Crete
 Peter Bien (ed. and tr.), The Selected Letters of Nikos Kazantzakis (Princeton, PUP, 2011) (Princeton Modern Greek Studies).

Anthologies
A Tiny Anthology of Kazantzakis. Remarks on the Drama, 1910–1957, compiled by Peter Bien, "The Literary Review" 18, No. 4 (Summer 1975), pp. 455–459 {61}.

References

Further reading
 Pandelis Prevelakis, Nikos Kazantzakis and His Odyssey. A Study of the Poet and the Poem, translated from the Greek by Philip Sherrard, with a prefaction by Kimon Friar, New York: Simon & Schuster, 1961.
 Peter Bien, Nikos Kazantzakis, 1962; New York: Columbia University Press, 1972.
 Peter Bien, Nikos Kazantzakis and the Linguistic Revolution in Greek Literature, Princeton, N.J.: Princeton University Press, 1972.
 Peter Bien, Tempted by happiness. Kazantzakis' post-Christian Christ Wallingford, Pa.: Pendle Hill Publications, 1984.
 Peter Bien, Kazantzakis. Politics of the Spirit, Princeton, N.J.: Princeton University Press, 1989.
 Darren J. N. Middleton and Peter Bien, ed., God's struggler. Religion in the Writings of Nikos Kazantzakis, Macon, Ga.: Mercer University Press, 1996
 Darren J. N. Middleton, Novel Theology: Nikos Kazantzakis' Encounter with Whiteheadian Process Theism, Macon, Ga.: Mercer University Press, 2000.
 Darren J. N. Middleton, Scandalizing Jesus?: Kazantzakis' 'Last Temptation of Christ' Fifty Years On, New York: Continuum, 2005.
 Darren J. N. Middleton, Broken Hallelujah: Nikos Kazantzakis and Christian Theology, Lanham, Md.: Rowman and Littlefield, 2006.
 Helen Kazantzakis, Nikos Kazantzakis. A biography based on his letters, translated by Amy Mims, New York: Simon & Schuster, 1968; Bruno Cassirer, Oxford, 1968; Berkeley: Creative Arts Book Co. for Donald S. Ellis, 1983.
 John (Giannes) Anapliotes, The Real Zorbas and Nikos Kazantzakis, translated by Lewis A. Richards, Amsterdam: Hakkert, 1978.
 James F. Lea, Kazantzakis: The Politics of Salvation, foreword by Helen Kazantzakis, The University of Alabama Press, 1979.
 Kimon Friar, The spiritual odyssey of Nikos Kazantzakis. A talk, edited and with an introduction by Theofanis G. Stavrou, St. Paul, Minn.: North Central Pub. Co., 1979.
 Morton P. Levitt, The Cretan Glance, The World and Art of Nikos Kazantzakis, Columbus, OH: Ohio State University Press, 1980.
 Daniel A. Dombrowski, Kazantzakis and God, Albany: State University of New York Press, 1997.
 Colin Wilson and Howard F. Dossor, Nikos Kazantzakis, Nottingham: Paupers, 1999.
 Dossor, Howard F. The Existential Theology of Nikos Kazantzakis, Wallingford Pa (Pendle Hill Pamphlets No 359), 2002
 Lewis Owen, Creative Destruction: Nikos Kazantzakis and the Literature of Responsibility, Macon, Ga.: Mercer University Press, 2003.
 Ioannis G. Zaglaris, "Nikos Kazantzakis and thought leadership", 2013.
 Ioannis G. Zaglaris, "Nikos Kazantzakis - end of time due to copyright", GISAP: Educational Sciences, 4, pp. 53-54, 2014
 Ioannis G. Zaglaris, "Challenge in Writing", 2015

External links

The Nikos Kazantzakis Museum, Crete
The Nikos Kazantzakis Pages at the Historical Museum of Crete
Iran to pay homage to Greek author Kazantzakis – Tehran Times, 10 April 2008
Society of Nikos Kazantzakis friends 
Kazantzakis museum
Nikos Kazantzakis Quotes
 

 
1883 births
1957 deaths
20th-century Greek philosophers
20th-century Greek poets
20th-century Greek novelists
People from Ottoman Crete
Greeks from the Ottoman Empire
Greek nationalists
20th-century Greek dramatists and playwrights
Greek agnostics
Writers from Heraklion
Cretan novelists
Greek journalists
20th-century travel writers
Greek travel writers
Greek speculative fiction writers
National and Kapodistrian University of Athens alumni
Greek male poets
Greek male novelists
Greek socialists
Male dramatists and playwrights
Criticism of Eastern Orthodox Church
Translators of Dante Alighieri
Translators of Homer
Translators of Friedrich Nietzsche
Epic poets
20th-century journalists
People associated with Mount Athos